Rodel M. Batocabe (April 25, 1966 – December 22, 2018) was a Filipino lawyer, politician, and member of the Ako Bicol Political Party (AKB). Batocabe served in the House of Representatives of the Philippines for three terms from 2010 until his murder in office on December 22, 2018, at a gift-giving event for senior citizens in the village of Burgos, Daraga municipality, Albay. Batocabe was the first sitting member of the House of Representatives to be killed during the administration of Rodrigo Duterte, but he was the 21st Filipino official to be murdered since Duterte's tenure began in 2016. Batocabe was a political ally of President Duterte.

Biography
Batocabe was born on April 25, 1966. Batocabe earned a bachelor's degree with honors in economics from the University of the Philippines Diliman. He then received his law degree from the University of the Philippines College of Law and a master's degree in public administration from the University of the Philippines Diliman.

Batocabe was first elected to House of Representatives of the Philippines in 2010, an office he held until his death.

Murder
In 2018 Batocabe announced his candidacy for Mayor of Daraga in Albay province in the forthcoming May 2019 general elections. He would have challenged Daraga Mayor Carlwyn Baldo, who was also seeking re-election (under Lakas) in 2019.

On December 22, 2018, Batocabe was attending a gift giving event for senior citizens in the small village of Burgos in Daraga, Albay. Two men approached Batocabe, who was 52 years-old, at the event and shot him eight times. His police escort, Officer Orlando Diaz, was also killed, while seven elderly attendees were also wounded in the attack. Batocabe and Diaz were taken to a hospital in Legazpi City, where both were pronounced dead. By coincidence, December 22 also marked Batocabe's wedding anniversary to his wife, Gertie.

On January 3, 2019, police announced that Daraga Mayor Carlwyn Baldo had ordered the killing of Rep. Batocabe. At the time of his murder, Batocabe was running for Mayor of Daraga, while Baldo was seeking re-election. According to the police, Baldo hired six men to kill Batocabe and set up $95,000 in funds to pay for the murder. The plot had allegedly been in the works since August 2018, when Baldo supplied $4,600 to one of the hitmen to purchase guns and motorcycles. Mayor Carlwyn Baldo denied the allegations in a statement read over the phone to local radio stations, calling himself "a convenient scapegoat."

References

1966 births
2018 deaths
Party-list members of the House of Representatives of the Philippines
Ako Bicol politicians
Assassinated Filipino politicians
Deaths by firearm in the Philippines
20th-century Filipino lawyers
University of the Philippines Diliman alumni
People from Albay